J Ballantyne and Company Ltd, trading as Ballantynes is a Christchurch, New Zealand-based department store operator. Established in 1854, it is New Zealand's oldest department store. Ballantynes is also a member of the Intercontinental Group of Department Stores membership of which is limited to one company per country. As well as their flagship store in Christchurch Central City, the Cantabrian company operates a store in Timaru. The company also operates Contemporary Lounge, offering more youth-oriented fashion styles within the Christchurch store.

History
The company traces its origins back to a millinery and drapery business that began in the front room of a Cashel Street residence in 1854. After being named Dunstable House and growing through owners and buildings, it was purchased by John Ballantyne in 1872.  The business was managed as a series of partnerships involving Ballantyne family members until formed as the company J. Ballantyne & Co. in 1920.

From its humble beginnings the Ballantynes business expanded until, by 1947, it occupied 80 m of street front in Cashel Street, 50 m in Colombo Street and another 21 m in Lichfield Street. This prime corner site covered about an acre that contained seven conjoined buildings, six of which had three or more hardwood floors that were interconnected on multiple levels by large passageways between the buildings to allow staff and customers to move freely about the store. By the time of the infamous Ballantynes fire it was widely known as the 'queen of department stores' in the city. The showrooms, fitting rooms, art gallery and sumptuous tearooms catered to the elite of Canterbury. The business was owned and managed by two brothers who were from the Ballantyne family.

Today Ballantynes is the last local department store in Christchurch. Closest rival Arthur Barnett, located in the former Beaths Department Store Building directly across Colombo Street closed down in February 2006. The nearest competitor in the city is the mid tier nationwide Farmers chain. The closest Farmers, farther down Colombo Street, was demolished in August 2012 after suffering heavy damage in the earthquake.

1947 Ballantynes fire

On 18 November 1947 Ballantynes was razed by one of the worst fires in New Zealand’s history. In mid-afternoon, when the fire began, an estimated 250–300 people were shopping at Ballantynes, which had a staff of 458. The fire is thought to have started in one of the basements of the Congreves building. At about 3.35 p.m. staff member Percy Stringer observed smoke emerging from the stairwell to this basement. He went to check but on encountering fumes and hot smoke returned to the ground floor. He asked another staff member, Edith Drake, to alert the fire brigade and management to a ‘cellar fire’. Though staff later confirmed witnessing an earlier call, Boon’s call at 3.46 p.m. was the first logged by the brigade. The 10-minute delay in placing the call, or in the brigade’s response, contributed to the tragic events that followed. By the time the brigade arrived at 3.48 p.m. – undermanned and ill-equipped to deal with anything but a cellar fire – the fire was already ‘surging out of control through all the horizontal and vertical vents and apertures’.

A civic funeral was held for the victims on Sunday 23 November. Approximately 800 family and friends filled Christchurch Cathedral for the church service. The funeral procession was so long that by the time the last car left the Square, the first had arrived at Ruru Lawn Cemetery in Bromley, more than 4 km away. People lined the streets along the procession’s route and approximately 10,000 attended the graveside service.

A Commission of Inquiry into the fire found both Ballantynes and the fire brigade responsible for the high loss of life. Ballantynes accepted its share of responsibility, but other businesses would probably have found themselves equally unprepared. The Commission’s recommendations proved to be a catalyst for change ‘in the way public buildings safeguarded staff and customers, and in the administration of the fire brigade’. When Ballantynes reopened on the same site in temporary premises in 1948, fire alarms had been installed and a new pamphlet on safety was issued to staff. The first rule – in bold type – described how to evacuate the premises in an emergency.

Canterbury earthquakes
The Christchurch store was closed for eight months following the February 2011 earthquake. Prior to 22 February, the company employed about 395 staff across its three stores, with about 300 at the City Mall store. The relatively modern construction and low height, at only two storeys, meant it was one of few central buildings relatively undamaged in the second earthquake. The Timaru and airport branches and online store remained open, and the Christchurch store in the City Mall was the first substantial retailer to reopen in the CBD on 29 November 2012 and is trading as normal.

Stores

Christchurch

The Christchurch store is a mid-sized department store on the corner of Colombo and Cashel Streets.

Current departments include cosmetics, men's fashion, men's underwear, travel goods and luggage, accessories, pantry, Floristry, stationery and homewares. The wider homeware department encompasses china and collectables, spa collections, appliances, kitchenware, glassware, bedding, and interiors. The latter include large concessions for Citta and French Country.

Fashion Atrium, ladies' fashion, lingerie, and ladies' footwear are located on the first floor. The lower ground floor includes children's wear, Solace Hair and Beauty (formerly The Salon at Ballantynes), a Beauty and Events Room, Customer Service, The Registry, toilets and a parents' room.

An all-new cosmetics hall was completed by the time the store reopened in November 2012. The hall is the largest and most extensive beauty department in the South Island.

Other stores and services
Not including The Pantry gourmet food department in Christchurch, Ballantynes operates three food outlets. The Tearooms are found on the lower ground floor of the Christchurch store. Kin Bistro and Winebar is on the ground floor and JB's Café is located at the Timaru branch.

The Christchurch store also offers a range of services, including 'Ballantynes by Appointment' personal shopping, Gift Registry, 'The Workroom' alterations and nationwide and international delivery. Ballantynes offers finance in the form of the Ballantynes Card store account card. Gift cards are also available. Ballantynes also offers extensive online shopping on its website. In mid-2012, Ballantynes launched Beauty VIP, a rewards programme for cosmetics in the Christchurch and Timaru stores, and at Solace Hair and Beauty in the Christchurch store.

The Timaru branch was first opened in 1883, but Ballantynes has been operating from the current location since 1913. The current store was opened in 1986. Today the Timaru store offers most of the major departments of the flagship store, on a much smaller scale.

Contemporary Lounge
Contemporary Lounge is a youth-oriented fashion store featuring local and international designers. The large store was an original tenant in the Re:START container ship mall. Opening in October 2011, the large Contemporary Lounge was located next to the Christchurch store, across Cashel Street. In April 2013 Contemporary Lounge returned to 663 Colombo Street on  Ballantynes' first floor.

See also
Smith & Caughey's 
Kirkcaldie & Stains 
Arthur Barnett 
H & J Smith 
Farmers

References

External links

Department stores of New Zealand
Companies based in Christchurch
1854 establishments in New Zealand
Companies established in 1854